The 23rd Genie Awards were held in 2003 to honour films released in 2002. The ceremony was hosted by Arsinée Khanjian and Peter Keleghan.

Nominees and winners
The Genie Award winner in each category is shown in bold text.

References

23
Genie
Genie